Seals is an unincorporated location in Camden County in the state of Georgia, United States. 

It is located at the point where the Old Jefferson Highway meets the railway line, just east of Floyd Hammock. 
It is shown on maps of the county between 1895 and 1955 as being about halfway between Woodbine and Kingsland, 

and can be seen on modern topographic maps.

Seals is the present northern terminus of the First Coast Railroad, leased from CSX Transportation in April 2005.
 

History
Before the American Civil War the county supported a number of plantations; sixty eight were documented in the county history book Camden's Challenge (Readdick 1976). However, many of these were abandoned after the Civil War, and small farms started to flourish instead. Many tiny communities were formed and later abandoned, some now little more than a few overgrown remains, but presenting undoubted possibilities for archaeological investigation. A line of the Florida Central and Peninsular Railroad, later part of the Seaboard Air Line Railroad, was opened in January 1894 between Kingsland and Woodbine, and Seals was on the line about halfway between the two. Seals was only one of many villages - others included Burnt Fort, Center Village, Kinlaw, Scarlett, Walker Swamp, Tompkins, Clarksville, Red Cap, Ceylon, Satilla Bluff and Spring Hill.

References

External links
Seals on Google Street View

Unincorporated communities in Camden County, Georgia
Unincorporated communities in Georgia (U.S. state)